Glen Boon Sun Chua (born July 9, 1987 in Lundu, Malaysia) is a Canadian film director, actor, and writer, best known for his independent films.

Biography

Early life 
Chua was born in Lundu, a little Malaysian village near the coast. He is the oldest son of his family; with a brother named Darren. At the age of seven, Glen began experimenting with his father’s Hi-8 video camera. Later in high school, along with a couple close high school friends, they created MOONLiTE Productions, a Canadian Youth Film/Media Production company.

Career 
His best known film is Three O'Clock, a film about how fate cannot be changed, starring Alexandra Caldwell and George Amoako.

With his interest in history, he also became known for his war epics, The Red Diary (2003), dealing with Japanese Americans during the Second World War, and The Ridge (2004), which featured the Canadian troops at Vimy Ridge during the First World War.

During the summer of 2007, Chua began production on his film titled Into the Black Woods. Chua also directed Memories in the winter of 2007. The film, a loose adaptation of Hans Christian Andersen's The Little Match Girl, tells the story of a homeless man who is given another chance to see his deceased wife.

Chua is also the founder and festival director of the Surrey International Film Festival which began in 2006 and takes place at the Surrey Arts Centre. Currently, the festival receives short films from around the world, focusing on Emerging Filmmakers.

References

External links
 Vancouver Sun Article
 MOONLiTE Productions Official Site
 
 Three O'Clock at IMDb
 

1987 births
Living people
Canadian male film actors
Film directors from Vancouver
Male actors from Vancouver
Asian-Canadian filmmakers